The Direct Payments to Farmers (Legislative Continuity) Act 2020 (c. 2) is an act of the Parliament of the United Kingdom that makes provision for the continuation of the making farming subsidies to UK farmers. The act provided for the direct payment schemes under the EU Common Agricultural Policy to become part of domestic law on the date of the UK's exit from the EU.

At the time of the introduction of the legislation the government confirmed its intention to provided for a new system for farm subsidies following 2020 moving away from direct payments to a payment system based on the 'public goods' produced by farmers. Such changes were introduced to parliament in the Agriculture Bill 2019-21.

See also
Agriculture in the United Kingdom
Common Agricultural Policy
Single Farm Payment

References

Agricultural subsidies
United Kingdom Acts of Parliament 2020
Brexit